Saint Benedict generally refers to Benedict of Nursia (480–547 AD).

St Benedict, St Benedict's, or variant forms may also refer to:

People
Benedict of Aniane (747–821), Benedictine monk and monastic reformer
Benedict Biscop (628–690), Anglo-Saxon abbot 
Bénézet (c. 1163–1184), or Benedict, the Bridge-Builder
Benedict (bishop of Milan) (died 732), archbishop of Milan c. 685 – c. 732
Benedict Joseph Labre (1748–1783), French mendicant and Franciscan tertiary 
Benedict the Moor (1526–1589), Italian Franciscan friar in Sicily
Benedict of Szkalka (died 1012), Benedictine monk 
Pope Benedict II (635–685)

Places
St. Benedict, Saskatchewan, Canada
St. Benedict, Iowa, U.S.
St. Benedict, Kansas, U.S.
Saint Benedict, Louisiana, U.S.
St. Benedict, Minnesota, U.S.
Saint Benedict, Oregon, U.S.
Saint Benedict, Pennsylvania, U.S.
San Benedicto Island, Mexico

See also

Benedict (disambiguation)
Monastery of St. Benedict (disambiguation)
São Bento (disambiguation)
St Benet (disambiguation)
Saint Benedict Abbey (disambiguation)
St. Benedict Catholic Secondary School (disambiguation)
St. Benedict's Church (disambiguation)
St. Benedict's College (disambiguation)
St Benedict's School (disambiguation)
Order of Saint Benedict, a Roman Catholic religious order